The 2008 Women's Cricket World Cup Qualifier was an eight-team tournament held in South Africa in February 2008 to decide the final two qualifiers for the 2009 Women's Cricket World Cup.  South Africa and Pakistan qualified, with the hosts beating Pakistan in the final.

Pre-tournament
The 2007 tournament was due to be played in Lahore, Pakistan in November 2007 but was postponed owing to the state of emergency in Pakistan, and subsequently shifted to South Africa, where was played in February 2008. The eight participating teams were divided into two groups. Group A featured South Africa, Bermuda, Papua New Guinea, Netherlands and Group B  featured Ireland, Pakistan, Zimbabwe and Scotland.

Regional qualification

Unlike in 2003, four teams had to qualify for the tournament. Ireland and South Africa qualified automatically as they played in the previous World Cup, the Netherlands and Scotland qualified automatically as the only remaining European teams.

Africa

The African leg of qualifying was a four team round-robin tournament played in Nairobi, Kenya in December 2006. Participating teams were Kenya, Tanzania, Uganda and Zimbabwe. Zimbabwe won all three of their games and qualified for the main tournament.

Americas

The Americas leg of qualifying was a three match series between Bermuda and Canada, played at Beacon Hill Park in Victoria, British Columbia, Canada in September 2006. Canada won the first match, but Bermuda came back to win the remaining two and thus qualify for the main tournament.

Asia

The Asian leg of qualifying was a three match series between Pakistan and Hong Kong, played in Lahore, Pakistan in September 2006. Pakistan won all three matches, two by over 200 runs, thus qualifying for the main tournament.

East-Asia/Pacific

The East-Asia/Pacific leg of qualifying was a three match series between Japan and Papua New Guinea, played in Port Moresby, Papua New Guinea in September 2006. Papua New Guinea won all three matches, thus qualifying for the main tournament.

Europe

Whilst Ireland, the Netherlands and Scotland are all already in the main tournament, all three teams will play against an England Development XI in the Women's European Championship in 2007, with the final group of the Netherlands and Scotland dependent on their position in this tournament.

Teams

First round

Group A

Group B

Playoffs

5th Place Semifinals

3rd place

5th Place

7th Place

Semi-finals

Final

References

2003
International cricket competitions in 2008
International women's cricket competitions in South Africa
2008 in South African cricket
2008 in South African women's sport
Sport in the Western Cape
Qualifier
2008 in women's cricket
February 2008 sports events in Africa